The  was held on 11 February 1990 in Kannai Hall, Yokohama, Kanagawa, Japan.

Awards
 Best Film: Dotsuitarunen
 Best New Actor: Hidekazu Akai – Dotsuitarunen
 Best Actor: Ryo Ishibashi – A Sign Days
 Best Actress: Anna Nakagawa – A Sign Days
 Best New Actress: Ayako Kawahara – Kitchen
 Best Supporting Actor: Yoshio Harada – Dotsuitarunen, Shucchō, Kisu Yori Kantan
 Best Supporting Actress: Haruko Sagara – Dotsuitarunen
 Best Director: Takeshi Kitano – Violent Cop
 Best New Director: Junji Sakamoto – Dotsuitarunen
 Best Screenplay: Hiroshi Saito and Yoichi Sai – A Sign Days
 Best Cinematography: Kenji Takama – Who Do I Choose?, Kaze no Matasaburo: Garasu no Manto
 Special Jury Prize: Yūsaku Matsuda (Career)

Best 10
 Dotsuitarunen
 Violent Cop
 A Sign Days
 Kitchen
 Kiki's Delivery Service
 Yuwakusha
 Who Do I Choose?
 Shucchō
 Shaso
 Black Rain
runner-up. Kisu Yori Kantan

References

Yokohama Film Festival
Yokohama Film Festival
Yokohama Film Festival
Yoko
Yokohama Film Festival